NGC 173 is an unbarred spiral galaxy located approximately 3.8 million light-years away in the constellation Cetus.

References

External links
 

0173
00369
+00-02-092
2223
J00371247+0156321
Unbarred spiral galaxies
Cetus (constellation)